Ron Promesse (born 31 August 1974) is an athlete from Saint Lucia

He represented Saint Lucia at the countries second Olympic Games when he competed at the 2000 Summer Olympic Games in the 100 metres, he didn't finish his heat so didn't advance to the next round.

References

1974 births
Living people
Saint Lucian male sprinters
Olympic athletes of Saint Lucia
Athletes (track and field) at the 2000 Summer Olympics
Athletes (track and field) at the 1999 Pan American Games
Pan American Games competitors for Saint Lucia